Alberta Beach is a village in central Alberta, Canada, west of Edmonton. It is located on the southeast shore of Lac Ste.

Alberta Beach's economy it is centred on tourism and recreation. The village is the site of the Lac Ste. Anne Pilgrimage, an event having key significance to Aboriginal people, including Cree, Dene, Blackfoot and Métis Roman Catholics. It is also notable as being one of Edmonton, Alberta's main cottage weekend retreats.

Alberta Beach is the only urban municipality (city, town, village, and summer village) in Alberta that does not include its municipal status in its official legal name. Its official name is simply Alberta Beach instead of Village of Alberta Beach like the convention used by other urban municipalities. Alberta Beach changed from this convention at the time it changed its municipal status from summer village to village on January 1, 1999.

History 

In 1912 the Canadian Northern Railway built its Edmonton–Vancouver line through what is now Alberta Beach. It brought its employees out for company picnics and holidays. By 1920 the area had incorporated as a summer village, built a dance pavilion, a large wooden pier, and several cabins. Other companies such as Marshall Wells and Woodward's then began to bring their employees out for the same relaxing and beautiful atmosphere.

There was such a demand for this atmosphere that the Moonlight Express was started. The railway picked people up in Edmonton on Saturday mornings, took them to Alberta Beach, then picked them up Sunday night to take them back to Edmonton.

Soon people began purchasing and building their own cabins and small businesses. On January 1, 1999, the summer village of Alberta Beach became a village. It now has 884 year-round residents and can swell to over 3,000 people during long weekends. A hotel and many small businesses operate within the village.

Demographics 

In the 2016 Census of Population conducted by Statistics Canada, Alberta Beach recorded a population of 1,018 living in 479 of its 743 total private dwellings, a  change from its 2011 population of 865.

See also 
List of communities in Alberta
List of villages in Alberta

References

External links 

1920 establishments in Alberta
Lac Ste. Anne County
Villages in Alberta
Former summer villages in Alberta